In evolutionary developmental biology, Paired box (Pax) genes are a family of genes coding for tissue specific transcription factors containing an N-terminal paired domain and usually a partial, or in the case of four family members (PAX3, PAX4, PAX6 and PAX7), a complete homeodomain to the C-terminus. An octapeptide as well as a Pro-Ser-Thr-rich C terminus may also be present. Pax proteins are important in early animal development for the specification of specific tissues, as well as during epimorphic limb regeneration in animals capable of such.

The paired domain was initially described in 1987 as the "paired box" in the Drosophila protein paired (prd).

Groups
Within the mammalian family, there are four well defined groups of Pax genes. 
Pax group 1 (Pax 1 and 9),
Pax group 2 (Pax 2, 5 and 8),
Pax group 3 (Pax 3 and 7) and
Pax group 4 (Pax 4 and 6).

Two more families, Pox-neuro and Pax-α/β, exist in basal bilaterian species. Orthologous genes exist throughout the Metazoa, including extensive study of the ectopic expression in Drosophila using murine Pax6. The two rounds of whole-genome duplications in vertebrate evolution is responsible for the creation of as many as 4 paralogs for each Pax protein.

Members
 PAX1 has been identified in mice with the development of vertebrate and embryo segmentation, and some evidence this is also true in humans. It transcribes a 440 amino acid protein from 4 exons and 1,323 in humans.
 PAX2 has been identified with kidney and optic nerve development. It transcribes a 417 amino acid protein from 11 exons and 4,261  in humans. Mutation of PAX2 in humans has been associated with renal-coloboma syndrome as well as oligomeganephronia.
 PAX3 has been identified with ear, eye and facial development. It transcribes a 479 amino acid protein in humans. Mutations in it can cause Waardenburg syndrome. PAX3 is frequently expressed in melanomas and contributes to tumor cell survival.
 PAX4 has been identified with pancreatic islet beta cells. It transcribes a 350 amino acid protein from 9 exons and 2,010  in humans.
 PAX5 has been identified with neural and spermatogenesis development and b-cell differentiation. It transcribes a 391 amino acid protein from 10 exons and 3,644 in humans.
 PAX6 (eyeless) is the most researched and appears throughout the literature as a "master control" gene for the development of eyes and sensory organs, certain neural and epidermal tissues as well as other homologous structures, usually derived from ectodermal tissues.
 PAX7 has been possibly associated with myogenesis. It transcribes a protein of 520 amino acids from 8 exons and 2,260 in humans.  PAX7 directs postnatal renewal  and propagation of myogenic satellite cells but not for the specification.
 PAX8 has been associated with thyroid specific expression. It transcribes a protein of 451 amino acids from 11 exons and 2,526 in humans.
 PAX9 has found to be associated with a number of organ and other skeletal developments, particularly teeth. It transcribes a protein of 341 amino acids from 4 exons and 1,644 in humans.

See also
 Homeobox
 Evolutionary developmental biology
 Body plan
 SOX genes

References

Further reading

External links
A Review of the Highly Conserved PAX6 Gene in Eye Development Regulation
 Paired domain in PROSITE
 

Developmental genes and proteins
Transcription factors